The 1994 season of the 3. divisjon, the fourth highest association football league for men in Norway.

Between 22 and 24 games (depending on group size) were played in 19 groups, with 3 points given for wins and 1 for draws. All group winners were promoted to the 2. divisjon.

Tables 

Group 1
Rakkestad – promoted
Kongsvinger 2
Rygge
Trøgstad/Båstad
Østsiden
Galterud
Nes
Rælingen
Torp
Hafslund – relegated
Løvenstad – relegated
Eidskog – relegated

Group 2
Skjetten – promoted
Nordstrand
Lisleby
Bækkelaget
Tune
Kolbotn
Kvik Halden
Tistedalen
Greåker
Høland – relegated
Bjørkelangen – relegated
Bøler – relegated

Group 3
Eidsvold Turn – promoted
Grei
Stovnerkameratene
Gjøvik-Lyn
Lillehammer FK
Grorud
Gjelleråsen
Eidsvold IF
Vardal
Ull-Kisa – relegated
Nordre Land – relegated
Kløfta – relegated

Group 4
Ham-Kam 2 – promoted
Vang
Sel
Fart
Raufoss
Biri
Brumunddal
Ottestad
Vinstra
Stange – relegated
Gran – relegated
Rena – relegated

Group 5
Liv/Fossekallen – promoted
Årvoll
Drafn
Frigg
Teie
Slemmestad
Flint
Vålerenga 2
Holmestrand
Ready – relegated
Lier – relegated
Bygdø – relegated

Group 6
Vigør – promoted
Kvinesdal
Vindbjart
Donn
Larvik Turn
Tjølling
Langesund
Drangedal
Gjekstad & Østerøya
Grim – relegated
Kragerø – relegated
Store Bergan – relegated

Group 7
Øyestad – promoted
Snøgg
Sørfjell
Jerv
Urædd
Skotfoss
Strømsgodset 2
Vikersund
Gulset
Steinberg – relegated
Rygene – relegated
Solberg – relegated

Group 8
Randaberg – promoted
Eiger
Stavanger
Sola
Mosterøy
Nærbø
Figgjo
Buøy
Staal
Varhaug
Egersund – relegated
Vardeneset – relegated

Group 9
Nord – promoted
Stord
Åkra
Bergen Sparta
Odda
Telavåg
Skjold
Trott
Follese
Lyngbø
Solid – relegated
Bremnes – relegated

Group 10
Nest – promoted
Florvåg
Varegg
Hovding
Løv-Ham
Bjarg
Nymark
Vadmyra
Sandviken
Radøy – relegated
Austrheim – relegated
Hardy – relegated

Group 11
Sogndal 2 – promoted
Stryn
Jotun
Tornado
Førde
Jølster
Høyang
Eid
Måløy
Fjøra
Eikefjord
Tempo – relegated

Group 12
Skarbøvik – promoted
Brattvåg
Sykkylven
Valder
Hareid
Aksla
Åram
Stordal
Spjelkavik
Stranda – relegated
Skodje – relegated
Hessa – relegated

Group 13
Kristiansund – promoted
Averøykameratene
Bryn
Tomrefjord
Molde 2
Surnadal
Træff
Moldekameratene
Isfjorden
Rival – relegated
Braatt – relegated
Midsund – relegated

Group 14
Orkanger – promoted
Hitra
Ranheim
KIL/Hemne
Røros
Nationalkameratene
Brekken
Heimdal
NTHI – relegated
Sverresborg – relegated
Alvdal – relegated
Freidig – relegated

Group 15
Fram – promoted
Sverre
Rissa
Kvamskameratene
Vuku
Fosen
Vikingan
Nessegutten
Tranabakkan
Henning – relegated
Vinne – relegated
Ørland – relegated

Group 16
Fauske/Sprint – promoted
Bodø/Glimt 2
Mosjøen
Grand Bodø
Sandnesssjøen
Bodøkameratene
Saltdalkameratene
Halsakameratene
Åga
Sørfold
Brønnøysund
Nesna
Olderskog – relegated

Group 17
Lofoten – promoted
Leknes
Vågakameratene
Kvæfjord
Stokmarknes
Morild
Skånland 
Landsås
Ajaks
Beisfjord
Luna– relegated
Andenes– relegated

Group 18
Skjervøy – promoted
Finnsnes
Tromsdalen 2
Balsfjord
Ulfstind
Fløya
Salangen
Ramfjord
Kåfjord
Ringvassøy
Mellembygd
Ullsfjord – relegated
Kvaløysletta – relegated

Group 19
Honningsvåg – promoted
Bjørnevatn
Polarstjernen
HIF/Stein
Nordlys
Kirkenes
Lakselv
Bossekop
Indrefjord – relegated
Nordkinn
Vardø – relegated
Bølgen

References

Norwegian Third Division seasons
4
Norway
Norway